The marsh babbler (Pellorneum palustre) is a member of the family Pellorneidae. The marsh babbler is endemic to the Brahmaputra floodplain, its associated tributaries and adjacent hill ranges in Assam, Arunachal Pradesh and Meghalaya in India and eastern Bangladesh.

References

marsh babbler
Birds of Northeast India
Birds of Bangladesh
marsh babbler